Ennor can refer to

Ennor, one of the alternative names for J. R. R. Tolkien's  fictional lands of Middle-earth
Ennor, the name of the single larger island off Cornwall which gave rise to what are now the Isles of Scilly as sea levels rose in early mediaeval times
Hugh Ennor (1912–1977), senior Australian public servant